GhettoPhysics: Will the Real Pimps and Hos Please Stand Up! is a 2010 docudrama film written and directed by William Arntz and E. Raymond Brown.  The film is based on Brown's 2003 book, Will The Real Pimps and Hos Please Stand Up! — Peeping the Multi-leveled Global Game. The book and the film examine the interplay between Pimps and "Hos" and how that dynamic is the oldest and simplest expression of the ways in which power is wielded in today's world.  The film uses documentary footage, animation, satire and dramatization to illustrate examples culled from the "hood" to Wall Street. Whether the players are real-life pimps or corporate executives, they are all playing the “game” and repeating the same power dynamics.

There have historically been many negative associations with the provocative language and images surrounding the sexual politics of the Pimp/Ho dynamic.  GhettoPhysics looks closely at this reality, then goes beyond the world of prostitution to illustrate and clarify how the game is played.  Weaving together theories of metaphysics and archetypal psychology, the film explains how the GhettoPhysics game crosses all races, all classes and all socio-economic levels.  There are elements of the Pimp and elements of the Ho in everyone, whether they are male or female, black or white, rich or poor.  The idea is to become aware of how the game is being played so one may take responsibility and gain more control over one's own life.

On the decision to utilize the Pimp/Ho metaphor for the film, Arntz and Brown explain, "We don’t normally refer to power interactions in say, politics or economics as a game.  But this is exactly what is taking place.  GhettoPhysics helps you become more aware of it and play it from a position of personal power."

Synopsis
The basic tenet of GhettoPhysics is that the Pimp/Ho game is the fundamental expression of how people interact in the world. But this interaction is so multilayered and can become so complex that it is hard to see the game. However, by looking at the world using the Pimp/Ho dynamic, it becomes very easy to see the manipulations that keep society's Hos forever in debt, disempowered or marching off to war, while society’s Pimps remain rich, powerful, and in control.

The film includes interviews with notable entertainers and thinkers such as Dr. Cornel West, Ice-T, Norman Lear, Cynthia McKinney, KRS-One, John Perkins (author), Byron Katie, Too Short, and William Arntz.  It also includes a colorful contingent of street characters, with names such as Fillmore Slim, Candy, Hook da Crook, Loreal, Mac Breed and Lo Da Show.

The Pimp/Ho dynamic is not limited to the streets of the inner city ghettos, but extends throughout all aspects of today’s society from government to business, religion and education.  Analyzing real world issues such as the global economic crisis, the Gulf oil spill, global ecological threats, healthcare reform and war, GhettoPhysics details the street world and then moves to the classroom and the corporate boardroom to illustrate how the game is being played every day.

Release dates 
 October 8, 2010:  Atlanta, Oakland, Philadelphia, Detroit, Washington, DC
 October 15, 2010:  Tempe
 October 22, 2010:  New York, Los Angeles

Reception 
GhettoPhysics received reviews in numerous publications.  The San Jose Mercury News called the movie's material "engrossing" but said the presentation was "stiff and stagy." Superconciousness Magazine called the movie an "irreverent, cagerattling, cinematic jewel."

References

External links
  
Further reviews
 Review at Body Mind Spirit Guide
 Review at AOL News
 Review at AV Club
 Review at Electronic Urban Report
 Review at LA Weekly Online

2010 films
American documentary films
2010s English-language films
2010s American films